The Ministry of Agriculture, Livestock, and Food Supply (Ministério da Agricultura, Pecuária e Abastecimento, abbreviated MAPA) is a federal department in Brazil. The jurisdiction of this ministry is to formulate and implement policies for agribusiness development, integrating the aspects of market, technological, organizational and environmental care for the consumers of the country and abroad, promoting food security, income generation and employment, reducing inequalities and increasing social inclusion.

The Ministry was founded during the Brazilian Empire in 1860.  Originally named Secretaria de Estado dos Negócios da Agricultura, Comércio e Obras Públicas, the body was extinguished in the early years of the First Brazilian Republic and re-established in 1906 as the Ministerio dos Negocios da Agricultura, Industria e Commercio. In 1930, it was renamed the Ministério da Agricultura.

Agroenergy
Brazil is the world leader in producing agroenergy and the Ministry of Agriculture encourages policies which develop ethanol fuel production.

See also
 Ministry of Fishing and Aquaculture
 Ministry of Agrarian Development

References

External links

 

Brazil
Agriculture
Ministries established in 1860
1860 establishments in Brazil
Agricultural organisations based in Brazil